Theybf.com is a celebrity gossip website which focuses on news regarding prominent African American figures in Hollywood. Theybf.com, which is an abbreviation for the Young, Black and Fabulous, was launched in July 2005 by Natasha Eubanks after she noticed a lack of African Americans featured on gossip sites With no previous experience with web site development, Eubanks began experimenting with creating her own blog.

Background

The New Orleans Native, Natasha Eubanks was born in 1982. She later began calling Washington DC home after relocating there due to hurricane Katrina, which devastated the New Orleans area on August 29, 2005. Prior to becoming an entrepreneur Eubanks was an aspiring lobbyist who graduated from Texas A&M University with a political science bachelor's degree and was preparing for law school. While making her earnings as a hostess at Olive Garden she decided to make her hobby of reading blogs into a career. Fueled by passion, Eubanks dedicated her time to her blog, she completed one year of law school at Loyola (New Orleans) before dropping out against her parents will. Theybf.com continued to grow over time becoming Eubanks' full-time career.

Site statistics
Theybf.com is ranked by The Web Information Company, Alexa which gives the website a ranking of 2,067 as of November 2010. According to Black Enterprise Magazine, the ybf.com averages approximately 15 million views per month earning a revenue of 1 million dollars per year, 90% being from advertising.

Popular stories

Theybf.com breaks ground breaking news regarding prominent African American celebrities and public figures. Some of the sites most popular post included  topics of Montana Fishburne, Laurence Fishburne's daughter, announcement of signing with Vivid Entertainment, news pertaining to the allegations of Bishop Eddie Long and Updates regarding Chris Brown.

Media influence
Natasha Eubanks has been featured on NBC Washington, Black Enterprise magazine, and many websites. Eubanks has previously covered the Academy Awards, Grammys and the MTV Video Music Awards. Theybf.com comcorrespondents are present at countless celebrity events.

Marketing and development
In late 2009, Eubanks contracted the Manhattan-based digital and marketing agency BOX Creative to rebuild the current branding and website platform. BOX Creative was responsible for the marketing and development of RadarOnline.com, which was Eubanks initial motive in contacting BOX Creative.

Initially developed on WordPress, BOX Creative redeveloped the platform on the Drupal 6 CMS to provide more expandability and speed. The iPhone app, YBF videos section, and online store are planned to be developed sometime in 2012.

References

American entertainment news websites